Robert Wuhl (born October 9, 1951) is an American actor, comedian and writer. He is best known as the creator and star of the television comedy series Arliss (1996–2002) and for his portrayal of newspaper reporter Alexander Knox in Tim Burton's Batman (1989) and Larry in Bull Durham (1988).

Early life
Wuhl was born in Union, New Jersey to a Jewish family. His father worked as a produce distributor. After attending Union High School, Wuhl headed to the University of Houston, where he was active in the drama department and the Epsilon-Omicron chapter of Tau Kappa Epsilon fraternity.  Wuhl was awarded a Distinguished Alumni Award from his alma mater in April 2012.

Career
Wuhl's first role in movies was a starring role in the 1980 comedy The Hollywood Knights along with other fledgling actors Tony Danza, Michelle Pfeiffer, and Fran Drescher, followed by a small role in the film Flashdance (1983). Wuhl then had larger roles in movies including Good Morning, Vietnam (1987) with Robin Williams, Bull Durham (1988) with Kevin Costner, Tim Burton's 1989 Batman (as reporter Alexander Knox) with Michael Keaton, Blaze (1989) with Paul Newman, Missing Pieces (1991) with Eric Idle, Mistress (1992) with Robert De Niro, Blue Chips (1994) with Nick Nolte, and Cobb (1994) with Tommy Lee Jones. He wrote two of the six episodes for the TV series Police Squad! in 1982, and did an audio commentary for its release on DVD in 2006.

Wuhl appeared once on both The Dating Game and The $10,000 Pyramid.

He and Keith Carradine appeared in the 1985 music video to Madonna's hit "Material Girl". In 1992, he appeared in The Bodyguard as host of the Oscars. 

Wuhl won two Emmy Awards for co-writing the Academy Awards in 1990 and 1991 with Billy Crystal, Bruce Vilanch, David Steinberg, and others.

From 1996 to 2002 he wrote and starred in the HBO series Arli$$ as the title character, an agent for high-profile athletes. 

From 2000 to 2001, he was a frequent panelist on the ESPN game show 2 Minute Drill, often quizzing the contestants on sports-related movies. Wuhl was a player in the Game Show Network's Poker Royale series, a competition between pros and comedians.

In 2006, he starred on HBO in a one-man-show, Assume the Position with Mr. Wuhl, where he taught a history class to show how history is created and propagated in a similar fashion to pop culture. A second chapter entitled Assume the Position 201 with Mr. Wuhl aired on HBO in July 2007. Wuhl is currently developing a stage adaptation of Assume the Position at Ars Nova in New York City.

Wuhl hosted a sports, sports business and entertainment daily talk radio show, for Westwood One (now Dial Global) from January through December 2011. Wuhl occasionally fills in for Boomer Esiason on the Boomer and Carton show.

Wuhl played "Herb Tucker" in a revival of Neil Simon's play, I Ought to Be in Pictures. In 2017, he appeared with Don Most in another Simon play, The Sunshine Boys, at Judson Theatre Company. 

In 2015, he portrayed himself on American Dad!, in the episode "Manhattan Magical Murder Mystery Tour". He then returned in 2017 to play himself again in the episode "The Talented Mr. Dingleberry". In 2019, he returned in the episode "One-Woman Swole", portraying himself as a judge in a bodybuilding contest. In 2021, he returned yet again in the episode "Cry Baby".

Filmography

Film

Television

References

External links

1951 births
Living people
American male film actors
American male television actors
American television writers
American male television writers
Jewish American male actors
American male comedians
Jewish American male comedians
Emmy Award winners
People from Union Township, Union County, New Jersey
University of Houston alumni
20th-century American comedians
21st-century American comedians
Union High School (New Jersey) alumni
Screenwriters from New Jersey
Comedians from New Jersey
21st-century American Jews